Baitul Huda (House of Guidance) may refer to:
 Baitul Huda (Sydney), Australia
 Baitul Huda (Usingen), Germany